Noémi Háfra (born 5 October 1998) is a Hungarian handballer for Győri ETO KC and the Hungarian national team.

In September 2018, she was included by EHF in a list of the twenty best young handballers to watch for the future.

She participated in the 2020 Summer Olympics and finished 7th.

Achievements
National team
IHF Women's Junior World Championship:
Winner: 2018
Youth European Championship:
Bronze Medalist: 2015
Domestic competitions
Nemzeti Bajnokság I:
Winner: 2015, 2021, 2022
European competitions
EHF Champions League:
Finalist: 2022

Individual awards
Hungarian Junior Handballer of the Year: 2017, 2018
 All-Star Left Back of the Junior World Championship: 2018
 All-Star Left Back of the European Championship: 2018
 All-Star Team - Best Young Player of the EHF Champions League: 2019, 2020
 Handball-planet Young World Female Handball Player: 2018–2019

References

External links

1998 births
Living people
People from Cegléd
Hungarian female handball players
Ferencvárosi TC players (women's handball)
Handball players at the 2020 Summer Olympics
Sportspeople from Pest County